Leonard Kirwa Kosencha (born 21 August 1994) is a Kenyan middle distance runner.

He won a gold medal at the 800 m at the 2011 World Youth Championships in Athletics. By running 1:44.08 at these Championships, he also broke Belal Mansoor Ali's old world youth best of 1:44.34, which had stood since June 17, 2005. Ethiopia's Mohammed Aman broke Kosencha's short-standing world youth best that September. He won the silver medal at the 2011 Commonwealth Youth Games that season.

He began the 2012 season well as he was runner-up to Mohammed Aman at the Colorful Daegu Meeting, then won the first 2012 IAAF Diamond League race in Shanghai.

Personal records

References

External links

1994 births
Living people
Kenyan male middle-distance runners